The 2015 Cal Poly Mustangs men's soccer team represents the California Polytechnic State University during the 2015 NCAA Division I men's soccer season.  The Mustangs are led by head coach Steve Sampson, in his first season at the helm.  They play all home games at Alex G. Spanos Stadium.

Schedule

|-
!colspan=6 style=""| Exhibition

|-
!colspan=6 style=""| Regular season

|-
!colspan=6 style=""| Big West Tournament

|-
!colspan=6 style=""| NCAA Tournament

Cal Poly Mustangs men's soccer